Eric IV  may refer to:

Eric (IV) of Sweden
Eric IV of Denmark ( 1216–1250) 
Eric IV, Duke of Saxe-Lauenburg (1354–1411/1412)